The year saw the Cuban Missile Crisis, which is often considered the closest the world came to a nuclear confrontation during the Cold War.

Events

January

 January 1 – Western Samoa becomes independent from New Zealand.
 January 3 – Pope John XXIII excommunicates Fidel Castro for preaching communism.
 January 8 – Harmelen train disaster: 93 die in the worst Dutch rail disaster.
 January 9 – Cuba and the Soviet Union sign a trade pact.
 January 12 – The Indonesian Army confirms that it has begun operations in West Irian.
 January 13 – Albania allies itself with the People's Republic of China.
 January 15 – Portugal abandons the U.N. General Assembly, due to the debate over Angola.
 January 16 – A military coup occurs in the Dominican Republic.
 January 19 – A counter-coup occurs in the Dominican Republic; the old government returns, except for the new president Rafael Filiberto Bonnelly.
 January 22 – The Organization of American States suspends Cuba's membership; the suspension is lifted in 2009 (47 years later).
 January 24 – The Organisation armée secrète (OAS) bombs the French Foreign Ministry.
 January 27 – The Soviet government changes all place names honoring Molotov, Kaganovich and Georgy Malenkov.
 January 30 – Two of the high-wire "Flying Wallendas" are killed, when their famous seven-person pyramid collapses during a performance in Detroit.

February

 February 3 – The United States embargo against Cuba is announced.
 February 4–5 – During a new moon and solar eclipse, an extremely rare grand conjunction of the classical planets occurs (it includes all five of the naked-eye planets plus the Sun and Moon), all of them within 16° of one another on the ecliptic. A total solar eclipse is visible in Asia, Australia and the Pacific Ocean, and is the 49th solar eclipse of Solar Saros 130.
 February 5 – French President Charles de Gaulle calls for Algeria to be granted independence.
 February 7
 The United States embargo against Cuba comes into effect, prohibiting all U.S.-related Cuban imports and exports.
 Luisenthal Mine Disaster: A coal mine explosion in Saarland, West Germany kills 299.
 February 10 – Captured American spy pilot Francis Gary Powers is exchanged for captured Soviet spy Rudolf Abel, in Berlin.
 February 11 – The inaugural 24 Hours of Daytona sports car endurance race is run as a 3-hour event, at Daytona Beach, Florida.
 February 12 – Six members of the Committee of 100 of the Campaign for Nuclear Disarmament in the U.K. are found guilty of a breach of the Official Secrets Act.
 February 14 – First Lady Jacqueline Kennedy takes television viewers on a tour of the White House.
 February 15 – Urho Kekkonen is re-elected president of Finland.
 February 17 – Heavy storms and high tides result in the North Sea flood of 1962 on Germany's North Sea coast, mainly around Hamburg; more than 300 people die and thousands lose their homes.
 February 18 – 1962 NHRA Winternationals: Carol Cox becomes the first woman allowed to race at a National Hot Rod Association national event; she wins in the Super Stock class.
 February 20 – Project Mercury: While aboard Friendship 7, John Glenn becomes the first American to orbit the Earth, three times in 4 hours, 55 minutes.
 February 21 – Margot Fonteyn and Rudolf Nureyev first dance together in a Royal Ballet performance of Giselle, in London.

March

 March 1
 American Airlines Flight 1 (a Boeing 707) crashes on takeoff at New York International Airport, after a rudder malfunction causes an uncontrolled roll, resulting in the loss of control of the aircraft, with the loss of all 95 on board.
 The S. S. Kresge Company opens its first Kmart discount store in Garden City, Michigan.
 March 2 – A military coup in Burma brings General Ne Win to power.
 March 7 – Ash Wednesday Storm: A snow storm batters the Mid-Atlantic.
 March 8–12 – In Geneva, France and the Algerian FLN begin negotiations.
 March 15 – Katangan Prime Minister Moise Tshombe begins negotiations, to rejoin the Congo.
 March 16 – Flying Tiger Line Flight 739, a Lockheed L-1049H Super Constellation chartered by the United States Military Air Transport Service, and carrying mainly United States Army personnel bound for South Vietnam, vanishes over the western Pacific Ocean, with the loss of all 107 on board (no wreckage or bodies are ever found).
 March 18
 Évian Accords: France and Algeria sign an agreement in Évian-les-Bains, ending the Algerian War.
 "Un premier amour", sung by Isabelle Aubret (music by Claude-Henri Vic, lyrics by Roland Stephane Valade), wins the Eurovision Song Contest 1962 for France.
 March 19 – An armistice begins in Algeria; however, the OAS continues its terrorist attacks against Algerians
 March 23 – The Scandinavian States of the Nordic Council sign the Helsinki Convention on Nordic Co-operation.
 March 24 – OAS leader Edmond Jouhaud is arrested in Oran.
 March 26 – France shortens the term for military service from 26 months to 18.

April

 April 3 – Jawaharlal Nehru is elected de facto Prime Minister of India, for the fourth time.
 April 6 – Belgium reestablishes diplomatic relations with the Congo.
 April 7 – Milovan Đilas, author and former vice-president of Yugoslavia is re-arrested.
 April 8 – In France, the Évian Accords are adopted in a referendum, with a majority of 90%.
 April 9 – The 34th Academy Awards Ceremony is held; West Side Story wins Best Picture.
 April 13 – OAS leader Edmond Jouhaud is sentenced to death in France.
 April 14 – A Cuban military tribunal convicts 1,179 Bay of Pigs attackers.
 April 18 – The Commonwealth Immigration Bill in the United Kingdom removes free immigration from the citizens of member states of the Commonwealth of Nations.
 April 20 – OAS leader Raoul Salan is arrested in Algiers.
 April 21 – The Century 21 Exposition World's Fair opens in Seattle, United States.
 April 26 – The Ranger 4 spacecraft crashes into the Moon.

May

 May 1
 Norwich City F.C. wins the English Football League Cup, beating Rochdale in the final.
 Dayton Hudson Corporation opens the first of its Target discount stores, in Roseville, Minnesota.
 May 2
 An OAS bomb explodes in Algeria; this and other attacks kill 110 and injure 147.
 S.L. Benfica beats FC Barcelona 5–3 at the Olympic Stadium (Amsterdam), to win the 1961–62 European Cup in association football.
 May 3 – Mikawashima train crash: 160 die in a triple-train disaster near Tokyo.
 May 5 – Twelve East Germans escape via a tunnel, under the Berlin Wall.
 May 6 
Antonio Segni is elected President of the Italian Republic.
A test of a W47 warhead fired from a Polaris missile, the only time a nuclear missile has been test fired with its warhead detonated, occurs near Palmyra Atoll south of Hawaii. 
 May 14
 Juan Carlos of Spain marries the Greek Princess Sophia in Athens.
 Milovan Đilas is given a further sentence in Yugoslavia, for publishing Conversations with Stalin.
 May 22 – Continental Airlines Flight 11 crashes near Unionville, Missouri, after the in-flight detonation of a bomb near the rear lavatory; all 45 passengers and crew aboard are killed.
 May 23
 Drilling for the new Montreal Subway commences.
 Raoul Salan, founder of the French terrorist Organisation armée secrète, is sentenced to life imprisonment in France.
 Ruben Jaramillo, Mexican peasant leader, and his wife and children, are gunned down by the Mexican army and federal police in Xochitepec, Morelos, Mexico.
 May 24 – Project Mercury: Scott Carpenter orbits the Earth 3 times, in the Aurora 7 space capsule.
 May 25 – The new Coventry Cathedral is consecrated in England.
 May 29 – Negotiations between the OAS and the FLA lead to a real armistice in Algeria.
 May 30 – The 1962 FIFA World Cup begins in Chile.

June

 June – Rachel Carson's Silent Spring begins serialization in The New Yorker; it is released as a book on September 27 in the U.S., giving rise to the modern environmentalist movement.
 June 3 – Air France Flight 007 (a Boeing 707) crashes on take-off at Orly Airport in Paris; 130 of 132 people on board are killed, 2 flight attendants survive. Most victims are cultural and civic leaders of Atlanta.
 June 11
 President John F. Kennedy gives the commencement address at Yale University.
 Frank Lee Morris, John Anglin and Clarence Anglin escape from the Alcatraz Island prison
 June 15 – Students for a Democratic Society in the United States complete the Port Huron Statement.
 June 17
The OAS signs a truce with the FLN in Algeria, but a day later announces that it will continue the fight on behalf of French Algerians.
Brazil beats Czechoslovakia 3–1, to win the 1962 FIFA World Cup.
 June 22 – Air France Flight 117 (a Boeing 707 jet) crashes into terrain during bad weather in Guadeloupe, West Indies, killing all 113 on board, the airline's second fatal accident in just 3 weeks, and the third fatal 707 crash of the year.
 June 25
 Engel v. Vitale: The United States Supreme Court rules that mandatory prayers in public schools are unconstitutional.
 MANual Enterprises v. Day: The United States Supreme Court rules that photographs of nude men are not obscene, decriminalizing nude male pornographic magazines.
 İsmet İnönü of the CHP forms the new government of Turkey (27th government, coalition partners; YTP and CKMP).
 June 26 – A 2-day steel strike begins in Italy, in support of increased wages and a five-day working week.
 June 30 – The last soldiers of the French Foreign Legion leave Algeria.

July

 July 1
 Rwanda and Burundi gain independence.
 Algerian independence referendum, 1962: Supporters of Algerian independence win a 99% majority in a referendum.
 A heavy smog develops over London.
 The Helsinki Convention on Nordic Co-operation of March 23 comes into force in the Nordic countries.
 July 2
 Charles de Gaulle accepts Algerian independence; the French government recognizes it the next day.
 The first Walmart store, at this time known as Wal-Mart, opens for business in Rogers, Arkansas.
 July 5 – Algeria becomes independent from France.
 July 6 – Gay Byrne presents the first edition of The Late Late Show on RTÉ in the Republic of Ireland. Byrne goes on to present the show for 37 years, the longest period through which any individual hosts a televised talk show anywhere in the world, and the show itself becomes the world's second longest-running talk show.
 July 9 – American artist Andy Warhol premieres his Campbell's Soup Cans exhibit in Los Angeles.
 July 10 – AT&T's Telstar, the world's first commercial communications satellite, is launched into orbit and activated the next day.
 July 12 – The Rolling Stones make their debut at London's Marquee Club, opening for Long John Baldry.
 July 13 – In what the press dubs "the Night of the Long Knives", United Kingdom Prime Minister Harold Macmillan dismisses one-third of his Cabinet.
 July 14 – Norma Nolan of Argentina crowned Miss Universe 1962.
 July 17 – Nuclear testing: The "Small Boy" test shot Little Feller I becomes the last atmospheric test detonation, at the Nevada Test Site.
 July 19 – The first annual Swiss & Wielder Hoop and Stick Tournament is held.
 July 20 – France and Tunisia reestablish diplomatic relations.
 July 22 – Mariner program: The Mariner 1 spacecraft flies erratically several minutes after launch, and has to be destroyed.
 July 23 – Telstar relays the first live trans-Atlantic television signal.
 July 25
 The first armed helicopter company of the United States Army is formed at Okinawa, Japan.
 The International Agreement on the Neutrality of Laos is signed in Geneva.
 July 31
 Algeria proclaims independence; Ahmed Ben Bella is the first President.
 A crowd assaults the rally of Sir Oswald Mosley's right-wing Union Movement in London.
 An annular solar eclipse is visible in South America, the Atlantic Ocean, Africa and the Indian Ocean, and is the 36th solar eclipse of Solar Saros 135.

August

 August 5
 Death of Marilyn Monroe: Marilyn Monroe is found dead from an overdose of sleeping pills and chloral hydrate at her home in Brentwood, Los Angeles; it is officially ruled a "probable suicide" (the exact cause has been disputed).
Nelson Mandela is arrested by the South African government near Howick, and charged with incitement to rebellion.
 August 6 – Jamaica becomes independent.
 August 15 – The New York Agreement is signed, trading the West New Guinea colony to Indonesia.
 August 16 – Algeria joins the Arab League.
 August 17 – East German border guards kill 18-year-old Peter Fechter, as he attempts to cross the Berlin Wall into West Berlin.
August 18 – Norway launches its 1st sounding rocket, Ferdinand 1 from Andøya Space Center and becomes a space nation.
 August 22 – An assassination attempt is made against French President Charles de Gaulle.
 August 24 
 A group of armed Cuban exile terrorists fire at a hotel in Havana from a speedboat.
 Indonesia officially launched television with the establishment of TVRI television network or Televisi Republik Indonesia (Indonesian National Channel)
 August 27 – NASA launches the Mariner 2 space probe.
 August 31 – Trinidad and Tobago becomes independent.

September

 September 1
 A referendum in Singapore supports the Malayan Federation.
 Typhoon Wanda strikes Hong Kong, killing at least 130 and injuring more than 600.
 September 2 – The Soviet Union agrees to send arms to Cuba.
 September 8 – Newly independent Algeria, by referendum, adopts a constitution.
 September 12 – President John F. Kennedy, at a speech at Rice University, reaffirms that the U.S. will put a man on the Moon by the end of the decade.
 September 19 – Atlantic College opens its doors for the first time in Wales, marking the birth of the pioneering United World College educational movement.
 September 21 – A border conflict between China and India erupts into fighting.
 September 22 – Bob Dylan premieres his song "A Hard Rain's a-Gonna Fall", at Carnegie Hall in New York City.
 September 25 – Sonny Liston knocks out Floyd Patterson two minutes into the first round of his fight, for the boxing world title in Chicago.
 September 26 – The North Yemen Civil War erupts.
 September 27 – A flash flood in Barcelona, Spain, kills more than 440 people.
 September 29 – The Canadian Alouette 1, the first satellite built outside the United States and the Soviet Union, is launched from Vandenberg Air Force Base in California.

October

 October 3 – Project Mercury: Mercury-Atlas 8 – Walter Schirra orbits the Earth six times, in the Sigma 7 space capsule.
 October 5
 The French National Assembly censures the proposed referendum to sanction presidential elections by popular mandate; Prime Minister Georges Pompidou resigns, but President de Gaulle asks him to stay in office.
 The Beatles' first single in their own right, "Love Me Do"/"P.S. I Love You", is released in the U.K. on EMI's Parlophone label. This version is recorded on September 4, at Abbey Road Studios in London, with Ringo Starr as drummer.
 Dr. No, the first James Bond film, premieres at the London Pavilion, featuring Sean Connery as the hero.
 October 8
 The German magazine Der Spiegel publishes an article about the Bundeswehr's poor preparedness; the Spiegel scandal erupts.
 Algeria is accepted into the United Nations.
 October 9 – Uganda becomes independent within the Commonwealth of Nations.
 October 11 – Second Vatican Council: Pope John XXIII convenes the first ecumenical council of the Roman Catholic Church in 92 years.
 October 14 – The beginning of the Cuban Missile Crisis: A U-2 flight over Cuba in the Caribbean photographs Soviet nuclear weapons being installed. A stand-off then ensues for another 12 days, after President Kennedy is told of the pictures, between the United States and the Soviet Union, threatening the world with nuclear war.
 October 20 – The Sino-Indian War, a border dispute involving two of the world's largest nations (India and the People's Republic of China), begins.
 October 22 – Cuban Missile Crisis: In a televised address, U.S. President John F. Kennedy announces the presence of Soviet missiles in Cuba.
 October 24 – Cuban Missile Crisis: The first confrontation occurs between the U.S. Navy and a Soviet cargo vessel; the vessel changes course.
 October 26 – Spiegel scandal: German police occupy the offices of Der Spiegel in Hamburg.
 October 27 – Cuban Missile Crisis: Vasily Arkhipov, executive officer of Soviet submarine B-59, refuses to launch nuclear torpedoes against the U.S. Navy. This event is widely regarded to be crucial in averting a worldwide nuclear war.
 October 28
 The end of the Cuban Missile Crisis: Soviet Union leader Nikita Khrushchev announces that he has ordered the removal of Soviet missile bases in Cuba. In a secret deal between Kennedy and Khrushchev, Kennedy agrees to the withdrawal of U.S. missiles from Turkey. The fact that this deal is not made public makes it look as though the Soviets have backed down.
 A referendum in France favors the election of the president by universal suffrage.
 October 31 – The United Nations General Assembly asks the United Kingdom to suspend enforcement of the new constitution in Southern Rhodesia (now Zimbabwe), but it comes into effect on November 1.

November

 November – Aleksandr Solzhenitsyn's novella One Day in the Life of Ivan Denisovich (Odin den' Ivana Denisovicha), the author's pseudo-autobiographical account of life in the gulag, is published in Novy Mir, in an unprecedented acknowledgement of the Soviet Union's Stalinist past.
 November 1
 The Soviet Union begins dismantling its missiles in Cuba.
 The comic book antihero Diabolik first appears in Italy.
 November 3 – Earliest recorded use of the term "personal computer", in the report of a speech by computing pioneer John Mauchly in The New York Times.
 November 5
 West German defense minister Franz Josef Strauß is relieved of his duties over the Spiegel scandal, due to his alleged involvement in police action against the magazine.
 Saudi Arabia breaks off diplomatic relations with Egypt, following a period of unrest, partly caused by the defection of several Saudi princes to Egypt.
 A coal mining disaster in Ny-Ålesund kills 21 people; the Norwegian government is forced to resign in the aftermath of this accident, in August 1963.
 November 6 – Apartheid: The United Nations General Assembly passes a resolution condemning South Africa's racist apartheid policies and calls for all UN member states to cease military and economic relations with the nation.
 November 17 – Dulles International Airport, in Washington, D.C., is dedicated by President John F. Kennedy.
 November 20 – Cuban Missile Crisis: In response to the Soviet Union agreeing to remove its missiles from Cuba, President John F. Kennedy ends the blockade of the island.
 November 21 – The Sino-Indian War ends with a Chinese ceasefire.
 November 23 – United Airlines Flight 297 crashes in Columbia, Maryland, killing all 17 on board.
 November 24 – The first episode of That Was the Week That Was, the groundbreaking satirical comedy program hosted by David Frost, is broadcast on BBC Television in the United Kingdom.
 November 26
 Spiegel scandal: German police end their occupation of Der Spiegel'''s offices.
 Mies Bouwman starts presenting the first live TV-marathon fundraising show (Open Het Dorp in the Netherlands), which lasts 23 hours non-stop.
 November 27 – French President Charles De Gaulle orders Georges Pompidou to form a government.
 November 29 – An agreement is signed between Britain and France, to develop the Concorde supersonic airliner.
 November 30 – The United Nations General Assembly elects U Thant of Burma, as the new Secretary-General of the United Nations.

December

 December 2 – Vietnam War: After a trip to Vietnam at the request of U.S. President John F. Kennedy, U.S. Senate Majority Leader Mike Mansfield becomes the first American official to make a pessimistic public comment on the war's progress.
 December 7 – Rainier III, Prince of Monaco revises the principality's constitution, devolving some of his formerly autocratic power to several advisory and legislative councils.
 December 8
 The first period of the Second Vatican Council closes.
 The North Kalimantan National Army revolts in Brunei, in the first stirrings of the Indonesian Confrontation.
 The 1962–63 New York City newspaper strike begins, affecting all of the city's major newspapers; it will last for 114 days.
 Queen Wilhelmina of the Netherlands, who died on November 28, is buried at the Nieuwe Kerk (Delft).
 The Wedding Day of Stuart and Gwen Flower in Hull
 December 9 – Tanganyika (modern-day Tanzania) becomes a republic within the Commonwealth of Nations, with Julius Nyerere as president.
 December 10 – David Lean's epic film Lawrence of Arabia, featuring Peter O'Toole, Omar Sharif, Alec Guinness, Jack Hawkins and Anthony Quinn, premieres in London; 6 days later, it opens in the U.S.
 December 11
 In West Germany, a coalition government of Christian Democrats, Christian Socialists and Free Democrats is formed.
 The last execution by hanging is carried out in Canada.
 December 14
 U.S. spacecraft Mariner 2 passes by Venus, becoming the first spacecraft to transmit data from another planet.
 Leonardo da Vinci's early 16th-century painting the Mona Lisa is assessed for insurance purposes at US$100 million before touring the United States for several months, the highest insurance value for a painting in history. However, the Louvre, its owner, chooses to spend the money that would have been spent on the insurance premium on security instead.
 December 15 – Storm over the North Sea: Belgian pirate radio station Radio Uylenspiegel is knocked off the airwaves, never to operate again.
 December 19 – Britain acknowledges the right of Nyasaland (modern-day Malawi) to secede from the Central African Federation.
 December 24 – Cuba releases the last 1,113 participants in the Bay of Pigs Invasion to the U.S., in exchange for food worth $53 million.
 December 30
 United Nations troops occupy the last rebel positions in Katanga; Moise Tshombe moves to South Rhodesia.
 An unexpected storm buries Maine under five feet of snow, forcing the Bangor Daily News to miss a publication date for the only time in history. The same day, also, the Netherlands are covered with several feet of snow.

Date unknown
 The laser diode is invented.
 Slavery in Yemen is abolished.

Births

January

 January 4
 Laila Elwi, Egyptian actress
 Peter Steele, American musician (Type O Negative) (d. 2010)
 Natalya Bochina, Russian athlete
 January 5 – Suzy Amis Cameron, American actress and model
 January 7
 Ron Rivera, American football player and coach
 Hallie Todd, American actress, producer and writer
 January 9 – Cecilia Gabriela, Mexican actress
 January 17
 Jim Carrey, Canadian actor and comedian
 Karl Davis, African-American fashion designer (d. 1987)
 Denis O'Hare, American-Irish actor 
 January 21
 Tyler Cowen, American economist
 Marie Trintignant, French actress (d. 2003)
 January 22
 Lyudmila Dzhigalova, Russian athlete
 Mizan Zainal Abidin of Terengganu, Yang di-Pertuan Agong of Malaysia
 January 23
 Stephen Keshi, Nigerian footballer and manager (d. 2016)
 Richard Roxburgh, Australian actor
 January 25 – Chris Chelios, American ice hockey player
 January 29 – Olga Tokarczuk, Polish novelist, Nobel Prize laureate
 January 30
King Abdullah II of Jordan
Mary Kay Letourneau, American child rapist (d. 2020)

February

 February 1 – Takashi Murakami, Japanese pop artist
 February 2 – Kátia Abreu, Brazilian politician
 February 5 
 Jennifer Jason Leigh, American actress
 Martin Nievera, Filipino singer
 February 6 – Axl Rose, American Musician, Singer/song writer of Guns N'Roses, 
 February 7
 Garth Brooks, American singer and songwriter
 David Bryan, American musician (Bon Jovi)
 Eddie Izzard, British actor and comedian
 February 8 
 Malorie Blackman, British author of young adult fiction 
 Timothy Britten Parker, American actor
 February 9
 Lolo Ferrari, French actress (d. 2000)
 Zoë Lund, American musician, model, actress, author, producer, political activist, and screenwriter (d. 1999)
 Dennis Padilla, Filipino comedian, TV host, radio broadcaster, and actor
 Dany Roland, Argentine-born Brazilian drummer, sound designer, actor, film director, and record producer
 February 10
 Cliff Burton, American musician and songwriter (d. 1986)
 Bobby Czyz, American boxer
 February 11 – Sheryl Crow, American singer-songwriter
 February 12
 Nana Ioseliani, Georgian chess player
 Jimmy Kirkwood, Irish field hockey player
 February 13
 Michele Greene, American actress
 Jackie Silva, Brazilian volleyball player
 February 14 – Ken Oosterbroek, South African photojournalist (d. 1994)
 February 17 
 Alison Hargreaves, British mountain climber (d. 1995)
 Lou Diamond Phillips, American actor
 February 19 – Nabila Khashoggi, American businesswoman, actress, and philanthropist
 February 21
 Vanessa Feltz, British television presenter
 Chuck Palahniuk, American author
 David Foster Wallace, American writer (d. 2008)
 February 22
 Steve Irwin, Australian zookeeper, television personality, wildlife expert, environmentalist, and conservationist (d. 2006)
 Ethan Wayne, American actor
 February 25 – Birgit Fischer, German kayaker
 February 26 – Domingos Montagner, Brazilian actor, playwright, and entrepreneur (d. 2016)
 February 27
 Adam Baldwin, American actor
 Grant Show, American actor
 February 28 – Angela Bailey, Canadian track and field athlete (d. 2021)

March

 March 2
 Jon Bon Jovi, American musician  
 Raimo Summanen, Finnish ice hockey player and coach
 Scott La Rock, American disc jockey (d. 1987)
 March 3 – Jackie Joyner-Kersee, American athlete
 March 6
 Rita Sargsyan, Armenian First Lady (d. 2020)
 Erika Hess, Swiss alpine skier
 March 7 – Taylor Dayne, American singer, songwriter and actress
 March 10 
 Jasmine Guy, American actress, director, singer and dancer
 Seiko Matsuda, Japanese pop singer and songwriter
 March 11 – Achmad Yurianto, Indonesian military doctor and bureaucrat (d. 2022).
 March 12 – Julia Campbell, American actress 
 March 14 – Tsvetanka Khristova, Bulgarian athlete (d. 2008)
 March 16 – Branco Mello, Brazilian singer, actor and writer
 March 17 – Kalpana Chawla, American astronaut (d. 2003)
 March 19 – Iván Calderón, Puerto Rican Major League Baseball player (d. 2003)
 March 20 – Stephen Sommers, American film director
 March 21
 Matthew Broderick, American actor and singer  
 Rosie O'Donnell, American comedian, actress, talk-show host and activist
 March 23 
Bassel al-Assad, Syrian politician, engineer and equestrian (d. 1994)
Sir Steve Redgrave, English rower 
 March 25
 Fernando Martín Espina, Spanish basketball player (d. 1989)
 Marcia Cross, American actress
 March 26 – John Stockton, American basketball player
 March 27 – Jann Arden, Canadian singer
 March 29 – Ted Failon, Filipino broadcast journalist and radio commentator
 March 30
 Mark Begich, American politician
 MC Hammer, American rapper and actor
 Michael Rooney, American choreographer
 Gary Stevens, English international footballer and manager

April

 April 2 – Clark Gregg, American actor, director, and screenwriter
 April 3 – Jaya Prada, Indian actress and politician
 April 5 – Sara Danius, Swedish writer and academic (d. 2019)
 April 8 – Izzy Stradlin, American guitarist
 April 9 – Imran Sherwani, British field hockey player
 April 12 – Carlos Sainz, Spanish rally driver
 April 13 
 Edivaldo Martins Fonseca, Brazilian footballer (d. 1993)
 Hillel Slovak, Israeli-American guitarist (Red Hot Chili Peppers) (d. 1988)
 April 15
 Nawal El Moutawakel, Moroccan hurdler
 Jhon Jairo Velásquez, Colombian hitman and drug dealer (d. 2020)
 April 16 – Antony Blinken, American diplomat, 71st United States Secretary of State
 April 18 – Jeff Dunham, American ventriloquist
 April 19 – Al Unser Jr., American race car driver
 April 20 
 Scott McGehee, American film director and screenwriter
April 21 – Craig Robinson, American college basketball coach
 April 22
 Han Aiping, Chinese badminton player (d. 2019)
 Jeff Minter, British video game designer and programmer
 April 23
 Bram Bart, Dutch voice actor (d. 2012)
 John Hannah, Scottish film and television actor 
 April 25 – Flex-Deon Blake, African-American gay pornographic actor (d. 2021) 
 April 26
 Debra Wilson, American actress and comedian
 Michael Damian, American actor and singer
 April 29 – Stephan Burger, German Roman Catholic archbishop

May

 May 1 – Maia Morgenstern, Romanian actress
 May 2
 Elizabeth Berridge, American actress
 Jimmy White, British snooker player
 May 3 – Anders Graneheim, Swedish bodybuilder
 May 5 – Kaoru Wada, Japanese composer
 May 7 – Ari Telch, Mexican actor
 May 8 – Natalia Molchanova, Russian free-diver
 May 9
 Dave Gahan, English singer-songwriter 
 Paul Heaton, English singer-songwriter 
 Sean McNamara, American film director, film producer, actor and screenwriter
 May 12 – Emilio Estevez, American actor
 May 13 – Eduardo Palomo, Mexican actor (d. 2003)
 May 14 
Ferran Adrià, Spanish chef and restauranteur 
Danny Huston, American actor and film director
 May 15 – Rod Lurie, American-Israeli director
 May 16 – Michele Marziani, Italian novelist and journalist
 May 17
 Lise Lyng Falkenberg, Danish writer
 Craig Ferguson, Scottish-American actor, comedian and television host 
 Kim Mulkey, American basketball player/coach
 Arturo Peniche, Mexican actor
 May 18
 Karel Roden, Czech actor
 Sandra, German pop singer
 May 19 – Frances Ondiviela, Spanish/Mexican actress
 May 20
 Aleksandr Dedyushko, Russian actor (d. 2007)
 Mike Jeffries, American soccer coach
 Ralph Peterson Jr., American jazz drummer and bandleader (d. 2021)
 May 21 – Cam Brainard, American voice actor and narrator
 May 22 – Brian Pillman, American professional wrestler (d. 1997)
 May 24 – Gene Anthony Ray, American actor (d. 2003)
 May 25 – Anders Johansson, Swedish drummer
 May 26
 Genie Francis, American actress
 Bobcat Goldthwait, American comedian
 May 27 
 Scott Perry, American politician
 Ravi Shastri, Indian cricketer
 May 28
 Brandon Cruz, American child actor and punk rocker
 François-Henri Pinault, French businessman
 May 30 – Timo Soini, Finnish politician
 May 31 
 Dina Boluarte, Peruvian politician, 64th President of Peru
 Corey Hart, Canadian singer
 Noriko Hidaka, Japanese voice actress
 Victoria Ruffo, Mexican actress

June

 June 1 – Sherri Howard, American athlete
 June 3 – David Cole, American record producer and songwriter (d. 1995)
 June 4
 Trinidad Jiménez, Spanish politician and diplomat
 Pam Shriver, American tennis player
 June 6 – Alex Datcher, American actress
 June 7 – Thierry Hazard, French singer and songwriter
 June 8 – Suzy Gorman, American photographer
 June 10
 Gina Gershon, American actress 
 Ralf Schumann, German sport shooter
 Ahmed Khaled Tawfik, Egyptian author and physician (d. 2018)
 June 11
 Olga Charvátová, Czech alpine skier
 Erika Salumäe, Estonian cyclist
 Toshihiko Seki, Japanese voice actor
 June 12 – Jordan Peterson, Canadian clinical psychologist and professor of psychology
 June 13
 Ally Sheedy, American actress
 Vladimir Pravik, Soviet firefighter (d. 1986)
 Bence Szabó, Hungarian fencer
 June 14 – Emilija Erčić, Yugoslav (Serbian) handball player
 June 15 – Andrea Rost, Hungarian lyric soprano
 June 16 – Arnold Vosloo, South African actor
 June 17 – Bap Kennedy, Northern Irish singer-songwriter (d. 2016)
 June 18
 Lisa Randall, American theoretical physicist
 Mitsuharu Misawa, Japanese professional wrestler (d. 2009)
 June 19 – Paula Abdul, American dancer, choreographer and singer
 June 20 – Alex Di Gregorio, Italian editorial cartoonist
 June 21
 Pipilotti Rist, Swiss video artist
 Viktor Tsoi, Soviet underground singer and songwriter (d. 1990)
 June 22
 Campino, German singer
 Stephen Chow, Hong Kong actor and director
 Clyde Drexler, American basketball player
 June 23 
 Kari Takko, Finnish ice hockey player
 Shriti Vadera, Baroness Vadera, Ugandan-born British banker
 June 24
 Harry van Bommel, Dutch politician, anti-globalisation activist and educator
 Juan Fernando Brügge, Argentine politician
 June 25
 Pavla Tomicová, Czech actress
 Ricardo Iorio, Argentine heavy metal musician 
 Bussunda, Brazilian comedian (d. 2006)
 June 26 
 Morten Skogstad, Norwegian drummer
 Hubert Strolz, Austrian alpine skier
 June 27
 Michael Ball, British actor and singer
 Ollanta Humala, Peruvian politician, 65th President of Peru
 Tony Leung Chiu-wai, Hong Kong actor
 Mambury Njie, Gambian politician
 June 29
 Mario Castañeda, Mexican voice actor and dubbing director
 Amanda Donohoe, English actress
 George D. Zamka, American astronaut
 Guy Lecluyse, French comedian and actor
 June 30
 Florence Pernel, French actress
 Predrag Bjelac, Serbian actress

July

 July 1
 Andre Braugher, American actor
 Rafał Bruski, Polish politician
 Ahmad Bin Byat, Emirati businessman
 July 2
 Doug Benson, American comedian, marijuana rights advocate, television host, actor and judge
 Roberto Blades, Panamanian Salsa singer
 Mahasweta Ray, Indian actress
 July 3 – Tom Cruise, American actor and film producer
 July 4 – Pam Shriver, American tennis player
 July 5 – Amrozi, Indonesian terrorist (d. 2008)
 July 6
 Christopher Chaplin, Swiss-English composer and actor
 Natalia Dicenta, Spanish actress 
 Gilbert Lam, Hong Kong actor
 July 7
 MC Jazzy Jeff, American rapper
 Klaus Tange, Danish actor
 Vadivukkarasi, Indian actress
 July 8 
 Oreste Baldini, Italian actor and voice actor
 Frank Gallagher, Scottish actor
 Joan Osborne, American singer and songwriter
 July 9
 Roni Ben-Hur, Israeli jazz guitarist
 Sukhbir Singh Badal, Indian politician
 Nikola Čuturilo, Serbian rock musician
 Jan Degenhardt, German Lawyer and folk-singer
 July 10 
 Trond Helleland, Norwegian politician
 Grant Kirkhope, Scottish video game composer
 July 11
 Fumiya Fujii, Japanese singer
 Pauline McLynn, Irish actress
 July 13
 Tom Kenny, American actor, voice actor, and comedian
 Zlata Petrović, Serbian pop singer
 Erry Yulian Triblas Adesta, Indonesian Academic figure
 July 14
 Michelle Ford, Australian swimmer
 Patricio Toledo, Chilean footballer 
 July 16
 Mathias Herrmann, German actor
 Uwe Hohn, German athlete
 Grigory Leps, Russian singer
 July 17 – Rita Rätsepp, Estonian actress and psychologist
 July 18 – Shaun Micallef, Australian actor, comedian and writer 
 July 19 
 Anthony Edwards, American actor and director
 Cynthia Farrelly Gesner, American actress
 Aya Kitō, Japanese diarist (d. 1988)
 July 20
 Carlos Alazraqui, American stand-up comedian, actor, voice actor, singer, impressionist, producer and screenwriter
 Abdulai Hamid Charm, Sierra Leonean judge
 Primož Ulaga, Yugoslavian/Slovenian ski jumper
 Emmanuel Niyonkuru, Burundian politician (d. 2017)
 Chee Soon Juan, Singaporean politician 
 July 21
 Gabi Bauer, German journalist and television presenter
 Ike Eisenmann, American actor and voice artist 
 July 22
Steve Albini, American musician, record producer and music journalist
Roman Madyanov, Russian actor
 July 23 
 Eriq La Salle, American actor
 Bruce Marshall, American ice hockey coach (d. 2016)
 July 24
 Federico Franco, Paraguayan politician, 49th President of Paraguay
 Johnny O'Connell, American race car driver
 July 26
 Galina Chistyakova, Ukrainian athlete
 Sergey Kiriyenko, Russian politician and statesman, 31st Prime Minister of Russia
 July 28 – Ray Shero, American hockey manager
 July 29
 Isabel Cristina Mrad Campos, Young Brazilian victim of feminicide declared blessed by Roman Catholicism (d. 1982)
 Scott Steiner, American professional wrestler
 July 30
 Kaveinga Faʻanunu, Tongan politician (d. 2011)
 Alton Brown, American chef and television show host 
 July 31
 John Laurinaitis, American professional wrestler
 Wesley Snipes, African-American actor and martial artist

August

 August 1
 Robert Clift, British field hockey player
 Jesse Borrego, American actor
 Cesar Montano, Filipino actor
 August 4 
 Roger Clemens, American baseball player
 Lori Lightfoot, African-American lawyer and politician
 August 5 – Patrick Ewing, Jamaican-born basketball player
 August 6 – Michelle Yeoh, Malaysian-born Hong Kong actress
 August 7 – Bruno Pelletier, Canadian singer
 August 8 – Yūji Machi, Japanese voice actor
 August 10 – Suzanne Collins, American television writer and author ((The Hunger Games))
 August 11 – Rob Minkoff, American filmmaker
 August 12 – Ariel López Padilla, Mexican actor
 August 13
 Marcello Novaes, Brazilian actor
 John Slattery, American actor and film director
 August 15 – Tom Colicchio, American chef
 August 16
 Ayub Bachchu, Bangladeshi singer-songwriter (d. 2018) 
 Steve Carell, American actor and comedian
 August 17 – Pierre Sanoussi-Bliss, German actor and director
 August 18
 Felipe Calderón, Mexican politician, 50th President of Mexico
 Rob Minnig, American musician (The Ocean Blue)
 August 19
 Valérie Kaprisky, French actress
 Bernd Lucke, German politician and economist
 August 20 – James Marsters, American actor and musician
 August 21
 Tsutomu Miyazaki, Japanese serial killer (d. 2008)
 Gilberto Santa Rosa, Puerto Rican salsa singer
 August 23 – Dean Karnazes, American ultramarathon runner
 August 24
 David Koechner, American actor and comedian
 Mary Ellen Weber, American astronaut
 August 25 – Theresa Andrews, American swimmer
 August 26
 Roger Kingdom, American hurdler
 Princess Lalla Meryem of Morocco
 August 28 – David Fincher, American director and producer
 August 29
 Jutta Kleinschmidt, German rally driver
 Lycia Naff, American actress and journalist
 August 30 – Alexander Litvinenko, Russian ex-KGB colonel and ex-FSB lieutenant-colonel (d. 2006)
 August 31
 Dee Bradley Baker, American comedian, announcer and voice artist
 Mark L. Walberg, American television personality and show host

September

 September 1 – Ruud Gullit, Dutch footballer
 September 2 – Keir Starmer, English politician, Leader of the Labour Party and Leader of the Opposition
 September 4 – Shinya Yamanaka, Japanese physician and researcher
 September 8 
 Thomas Kretschmann, German actor
 Miss Amy (Amy Otey), American musical fitness singer-songwriter
 Al Pardo, Spanish-born American baseball catcher
 Jay Ziskrout, American punk rock drummer
 September 11
 Kristy McNichol, American actress
 Victoria Poleva, Ukrainian composer
 September 12 – Dino Merlin, Bosnian singer-songwriter, musician and producer
 September 13 – Hisao Egawa, Japanese voice actor
 September 15 – François Bloemhof, South African author
 September 17
 Baz Luhrmann, Australian film director
 Hesham Qandil, 51st Prime Minister of Egypt
 September 19
 Shaharuddin Badaruddin, Malaysian politician (d. 2018)
 Cheri Oteri, American comic actress
 Gottfried von Bismarck, German aristocrat and socialite (d. 2007)
 September 20 – Vittorio De Angelis, Italian voice actor (d. 2015)
 September 21 – Rob Morrow, American actor
 September 22 – Martin Crowe, New Zealand cricketer (d. 2016)
 September 24
 Rosamund Kwan, Hong Kong actress
 Ally McCoist, Scottish footballer and pundit
 Nia Vardalos, Canadian-American actress
 September 25
 Ales Bialiatski, Belarusian human rights campaigner, Nobel Prize laureate
 Aida Turturro, American actress
 September 26
 Melissa Sue Anderson, American actress
 Anabel Ferreira, Mexican actress/comedian
 Steve Moneghetti, Australian long-distance runner
 Chunky Pandey, Indian actor
 September 28 – Grant Fuhr, Canadian hockey player
 September 29 – Roger Bart, American actor and singer
 September 30 – Frank Rijkaard, Dutch football player and manager

October

 October 1
 Esai Morales, American actor
 Fernando Albán Salazar, Venezuelan lawyer and politician (d. 2018) 
 October 2 
 Jeff Bennett, American voice actor and singer
 Tawfiq Titingan, Malaysian politician (d. 2018)
 October 3 – Tommy Lee, American rock musician and drummer
 October 5 – Michael Andretti, American race car driver
 October 11 – Joan Cusack, American actress and comedian
 October 12
 Carlos Bernard, American actor
 Branko Crvenkovski, President of Macedonia
 October 13
 Margareth Menezes, Brazilian singer
 Kelly Preston, American actress (d. 2020)
 Jerry Rice, American football player
 October 14
 Shahar Perkiss, Israeli tennis player
 October 16
 Manute Bol, Sudanese basketball player and activist (d. 2010)
 Flea, Australian-American actor and musician  
 Dmitri Hvorostovsky, Russian baritone (d. 2017)
 Tamara McKinney, American alpine skier
 October 17 – Mike Judge, American actor, voice actor, animator, writer, producer, director and musician
October 18 
 Young Kim, American politician
 Min Ko Naing, Burmese Democratic activist and dissident
 October 19
 Tracy Chevalier, American author
 Evander Holyfield, American boxer
 October 20 – Anatoly Khrapaty, Soviet Olympic weightlifter (d. 2008)
 October 21 – Miki Itō, Japanese voice actress
 October 22 – Bob Odenkirk, American actor and comedian 
 October 24 – Jay Novacek, American football player
 October 25
 David Furnish, Canadian filmmaker, director and producer
 Darlene Vogel, American actress
 October 26
 Cary Elwes, English actor and writer
 Riorita Paterău, Moldovan politician
 October 27
 Jun'ichi Kanemaru, Japanese voice actor
 Ang Peng Siong, Singaporean sportsman
 October 28 – Daphne Zuniga, American actress
 October 29 – Debra Sandlund, American actress
 October 30
 Stefan Kuntz, German football player and coach
 Courtney Walsh, West Indian cricketer
 Kristina Wagner, American actress

November

 November 1
 Sharron Davies, British swimmer/television presenter
 Magne Furuholmen, Norwegian musician (A-ha)
 Anthony Kiedis, American rock singer (Red Hot Chili Peppers)
 November 3
 Phil Katz, American computer programmer (d. 2000)
 Gabe Newell, American business executive
 November 6 
 Nadezhda Kuzhelnaya, Russian pilot and cosmonaut
 Aznil Nawawi, Malaysian television host
 November 7 – Bettina Hoy, German equestrienne
 November 9 – Dolores Delgado, Spanish politician and prosecutor 
 November 11
 Mic Michaeli, Swedish keyboardist
 Demi Moore, American actress
 Nicole P. Stott, American astronaut
 November 12
 Neal Shusterman, American author
 Naomi Wolf, American author, feminist and political consultant
 November 13 – Steve Altes, American humorist
 November 14
 Miriem Bensalah-Chaqroun, Moroccan businesswoman
 Laura San Giacomo, American actress
 Atsuko Tanaka, Japanese voice actress
 Harland Williams, Canadian-American actor and comedian
 November 15
 Mark Acres, American basketball player and educator
 Judy Gold, American comedian and actress
 November 17 – Jamie Moyer, American baseball player
 November 18 – Kirk Hammett, American guitarist (Metallica)
 November 19 – Jodie Foster, American actress and director
 November 21 – Steven Curtis Chapman, American Christian musician
 November 22 – Sumi Jo, Korean operatic soprano
 November 23 – Nicolás Maduro, 63rd President of Venezuela
 November 24 – John Kovalic, American cartoonist
 November 27
 Marumi Shiraishi, Japanese actress
 Davey Boy Smith, British professional wrestler (d. 2002)
 November 28
 Jane Sibbett, American actress and producer
 Jon Stewart, American actor, comedian, media critic and television personality, host of The Daily Show'' (1999-2015)
 November 29 – Andrew McCarthy, American actor
 November 30
 Bo Jackson, American football and baseball player
 Daniel Keys Moran, American writer

December

 December 1
 Sylvie Daigle, Canadian speed skater
 Hayashiya Shōzō IX, Japanese rakugoka, tarento and voice actor
 December 3 – Tammy Jackson, American basketball player
 December 5 – José Cura, Argentine tenor
 December 6 – Janine Turner, American actress
 December 9
 Albert Grajales, INTERPOL Director of Puerto Rico and martial artist
 Felicity Huffman, American actress
 Leslie Carrara-Rudolph, American actress, voice actress, singer, performer, puppeteer, speaker and artist
 December 10
 Rakhat Aliyev, Kazakh politician and businessman (d. 2015)
 Scott Capurro, American comedian, writer and actor
 December 11
 Ben Browder, American actor
 Denise Biellmann, Swiss figure skater
 Jasper Britton, English actor
 December 12
 Tracy Austin, American tennis player
 Arturo Barrios, Mexican long-distance runner
 Peter Bergen, American journalist
 Max Raabe, German singer
 December 14 – Yvonne Ryding, Swedish pageant winner (Miss Universe 1984)
 December 16 – Maruschka Detmers, Dutch actress
 December 17
 Paul Dobson, English footballer
 Richard Jewell, American security guard and media figure (d. 2007)
 Galina Malchugina, Russian athlete
 Rocco Mediate, American golfer
 December 18 – James Sie, American actor and voice actor
 December 21 – Steven Mnuchin, 77th United States Secretary of the Treasury
 December 22 
 Andrés Cantor, Argentine/American sportscaster
 Ralph Fiennes, English actor
 December 23 – Keiji Mutoh, Japanese professional wrestler
 December 24 – Kate Spade, American fashion designer (d. 2018) 
 December 25 
 Maryna Bazhanova, Russian handball player (d. 2020)
 Tony Currie, Australian rugby league player
 Francis Dunnery, English singer-songwriter and musician 
 December 27
 Pierlucio Tinazzi, Italian security guard (d. 1999)
 Mark Few, American basketball coach
 Bill Self, American basketball coach
 Sherri Steinhauer, American golfer
 Joe Mantello, American actor and director
 December 28
 Michelle Cameron, Canadian synchronised swimmer
 Choi Soo-jong, South Korean actor
 Michel Petrucciani, French jazz pianist and composer (d. 1999)
 December 29 – Carles Puigdemont, Spanish politician
 December 30 – Alessandra Mussolini, Italian politician
 December 31 – Pedro Cardoso, Brazilian actor, screenwriter, playwright and television director

Deaths

January

 January 1 – Diego Martínez Barrio, Spanish politician, 2-time Prime Minister of Spain (b. 1883)
 January 4 – Hans Lammers, German Nazi minister (b. 1879)
 January 6 – Marziyya Davudova, Soviet actress (b. 1901)
 January 13 – Ernie Kovacs, American TV comedian (b. 1919)
 January 16 
 Ivan Meštrović, Croatian-born American sculptor and architect (b. 1883)
 R. H. Tawney, English historian and social critic (b. 1880)
 January 17 – Gerrit Achterberg, Dutch poet (b. 1905)
 January 19 – Snub Pollard, American actor (b. 1889)
 January 20 – Robinson Jeffers, American poet (b. 1887)
 January 21 – Arturo Bragaglia, Italian actor (b. 1893)
 January 26 – Lucky Luciano, American gangster (b. 1897)
 January 29 – Fritz Kreisler, Austrian violinist (b. 1875)

February

 February 1 – Carey Wilson, American screenwriter (b. 1889)
 February 2 – Shlomo Hestrin, Canadian-born Israeli biochemist (b. 1914)
 February 4 – Daniel Halévy, French historian (b. 1872)
 February 5 – Jacques Ibert, French composer (b. 1890)
 James B. Leonardo, American politician (b. 1889)
 February 6
 Roy Atwell, American actor, comedian and composer (b. 1878)
 Hussein Khalidi, Jordanian statesman, 29th Prime Minister of Jordan (b. 1895)
 Cândido Portinari, Brazilian painter (b. 1903)
 February 10 – Eduard von Steiger, Swiss politician, 51st President of the Swiss Confederation (b. 1881)
 February 11 – Indalecio Prieto, Spanish Socialist politician (b. 1891)
 February 13 – Hugh Dalton, British Labour politician (b. 1887)
 February 17
 Joseph Kearns, American actor (b. 1907)
 Bruno Walter, German conductor (b. 1876)
 February 19
 James Barton, American actor (b. 1890)
 Georgios Papanikolaou, Greek inventor (b. 1883)
 February 20 – Halliwell Hobbes, English-born film actor (b. 1877)
 February 24 – Hu Shih, Chinese philosopher (b. 1891)
 February 25 – Antonina De Angelis, Italian Roman Catholic professed sister and blessed (b. 1880)
 February 27 – Willie Best, American actor (b. 1916)
 February 28 – Chic Johnson, American actor (b. 1891)

March

 March 1
 Roscoe Ates, American actor (b. 1895)
 Richard L. Conolly, American admiral (b. 1892)
 W. Alton Jones, American industrialist and philanthropist (b. 1891)
 Arnold Kirkeby, American hotelier, art collector and real estate investor (b. 1901)
 Emelyn Whiton, American Olympic sailor (b. 1916)
 March 2 – Walt Kiesling, American football player (Chicago Cardinals) and a member of the Pro Football Hall of Fame (b. 1903)
 March 3 – Pierre Benoit, French novelist (b. 1886)
 March 14 – Giovanna Berneri, Italian educationalist and anarchist (b. 1897)
 March 15 – Arthur Compton, American physicist, Nobel Prize laureate (b. 1892)
 March 19 - Vasily Stalin, Soviet general and son of Joseph Stalin (b. 1921)
 March 20
 C. Wright Mills, American sociologist (b. 1916)
 A. E. Douglass, American astronomer and founder of dendrochronology (b. 1867)
 March 23 – Josef van Schaik, Dutch politician (b. 1882)
 March 24
 Jean Goldkette, Greek-born jazz musician (b. 1893)
 Auguste Piccard, Swiss physicist, aeronaut and explorer (b. 1884)
 March 27 – Augusta Savage, American sculptor (b. 1892)

April

 April 1 – Jussi Kekkonen, Finnish major (b. 1910)
 April 3 – Benny Paret, Cuban welterweight boxer (died as result of injuries in the ring; b. 1937)
 April 4 – James Hanratty, English murderer, one of the last people to be hanged in the UK (b. 1936)
 April 8 – Juan Belmonte, Spanish bullfighter (b. 1892)
 April 10
 Michael Curtiz, Austrian-born film director (b. 1886)
 Manton S. Eddy, American general (b. 1892)
 April 14 – M. Visvesvaraya, Indian engineer and politician (b. 1861)
 April 15
 Clara Blandick, American actress (b. 1876)
 Arsenio Lacson, Filipino politician and sportswriter (b. 1911)
 April 17 – Louise Fazenda, American actress (b. 1895)
 April 20 – Grover Whalen, American politician (b. 1886)
 April 21 – Sir Frederick Handley Page, English aircraft manufacturer (b. 1885)
 April 22 – Vera Reynolds, American actress (b. 1899)
 April 24 – Milt Franklyn, American film composer (b. 1897)
 April 27 – Josefa Toledo de Aguerri, Nicaraguan pioneer educator (d. 1866)
 April 28 – Gianna Beretta Molla, Italian Roman Catholic pediatrician and saint (b. 1922)
 April 29 – Hajime Tanabe, Japanese philosopher (b. 1885)

May

 May 3 – Helen Dortch Longstreet, American social advocate, librarian, and newspaper woman (b. 1863)
 May 5 – Ernest Tyldesley, English cricketer (b. 1889)
 May 10 – Shunroku Hata, Marshal of the Imperial Japanese Army (b. 1879)
 May 12 – Pedro Pablo Ramírez, Argentine military general, 26th President of Argentina, leader of the World War II (b. 1884)
 May 13
 H. Trendley Dean, American dental researcher (b. 1893)
 Franz Kline, American painter (b. 1910)
 May 19 – Gabriele Münter, German painter (b. 1877)
 May 23 – Rubén Jaramillo, peasant leader assassinated by the Mexican Army (b. 1900)
 May 26 – Wilfrid Wilson Gibson, English poet (b. 1878)
 May 27 – Egon Petri, German pianist (b. 1881)
 May 31 – Henry F. Ashurst, American politician (b. 1874)

June

 June 1 – Adolf Eichmann, German SS officer and a major organiser of the Holocaust (executed) (b. 1906)
 June 2 – Vita Sackville-West, English writer and landscape gardener (b. 1892)
 June 4 – Charles William Beebe, American naturalist, ornithologist, marine biologist and entomologist (b. 1877)
 June 6
 Abba Ahimeir, Soviet-born Israeli journalist (b. 1897)
 Yves Klein, French painter (b. 1928)
 Guinn Williams, American actor (b. 1899)
 Joe Profaci, Italian-American mobster (b. 1897)
 June 7 – Korneli Kekelidze, Georgian philologist (b. 1879)
 June 8 – Eugène Freyssinet, French civil engineer (b. 1879)
 June 12 – John Ireland, English composer (b. 1879)
 June 13 – Sir Eugene Goossens, English composer (b. 1893)
 June 15
 Eugeniusz Baziak, Polish Roman Catholic archbishop (b. 1890)
 Alfred Cortot, Swiss pianist and conductor (b. 1877)
 June 16 – Aleksei Antonov, General of the Soviet Army (b. 1896)
 June 19
 Frank Borzage, American film director (b. 1894)
 Mihail Cămărașu, Romanian general (b. 1892)
 Will Wright, American character actor (b. 1891)
 June 24 – Lucile Watson, Canadian actress (b. 1879)
 June 25 – Sir Raymond Leane, Australian army general (b. 1878)
 June 27 – Paul Viiding, Estonian poet, author and literary critic (b. 1904)
 June 28 – Mickey Cochrane, American baseball player (Philadelphia Athletics) and a member of the MLB Hall of Fame (b. 1903)
 June 29 – Charles Lyon Chandler, American historian (b. 1883)

July

 July 1 – Bidhan Chandra Roy, Indian physician and politician, Chief Minister of West Bengal (b. 1882)
 July 2
 Arconovaldo Bonaccorsi, Italian soldier (b. 1898)
 Valeska Suratt, American stage actress, silent film star (b. 1882)
 July 4 – Rex Bell, American actor and politician (b. 1903)
 July 6
 John Anderson, British-born Australian philosopher (b. 1893)
 Paul Boffa, Maltese politician, 5th Prime Minister of Malta (b. 1890)
 William Faulkner, American writer, Nobel Prize laureate (b. 1897)
 Archduke Joseph August of Austria, Austrian field marshal and former regent of Hungary (b. 1872)
 July 8 – Georges Bataille, French writer and philosopher (b. 1897)
 July 10 – Yehuda Leib Maimon, Bassarabian-born Israeli rabbi and government minister (b. 1875)
 July 11 – Owen D. Young, American industrialist, businessman, lawyer and diplomat (b. 1874)
 July 12 – Roger Wolfe Kahn, American band leader (b. 1907)
 July 13 – Jerry Wald, American screenwriter and producer (b. 1911)
 July 18 – Denjirō Ōkōchi, Japanese actor (b. 1898)
 July 21 – G. M. Trevelyan, English historian (b. 1876)
 July 23 – Victor Moore, American actor (b. 1876)
 July 26
 Raquel Meller, Spanish singer and actress (b. 1888)
 George Preca, Maltese Roman Catholic priest and saint (b. 1880)
 July 27 – Richard Aldington, English poet (b. 1892)
 July 29 
 Leonardo De Lorenzo, Italian flautist (b. 1875)
 Ronald Fisher, English-born statistician and geneticist (b. 1890)
 July 30 – Myron McCormick, American actor (b. 1908)

August

 August 4 – Marilyn Monroe, American actress (b. 1926)
 August 5 – Ramón Pérez de Ayala, Spanish writer and diplomat (b. 1880)
 August 6 – Ángel Borlenghi, Argentine labor leader and politician (b. 1904)
 August 9 – Hermann Hesse, German-born writer, Nobel Prize laureate (b. 1877)
 August 15 – Lei Feng, Chinese soldier (b. 1940)
 August 18 – Cleo Ridgely, American actress (b. 1893)
 August 19 – Jean Lucienbonnet, French racing driver (b. 1923)
 August 21 – Ahmad Ibrahim, Malaysian-born Singaporean politician (b. 1927)
 August 22 – Charles Rigoulot, French Olympic weightlifter (b. 1903)
 August 23 – Hoot Gibson, American actor and film director (b. 1892)
Joseph Berchtold, Nazi officer, Second commander of the SS (b. 1897)
 August 24 – Mykolas Biržiška, Lithuanian politician (b. 1882)
 August 26 – Dušan Simović, Yugoslav general, 18th Prime Minister of Yugoslavia (b. 1882)
 August 27 – Leopoldo Panero, Spanish poet (b. 1909)
 August 28 – John Collum, American actor (b. 1926)
 August 29 – Georgina de Albuquerque, Brazilian painter (b. 1885)
 August 31 – Felicjan Sławoj Składkowski, Prime Minister of Poland (b. 1885)

September

 September 1 – Hans-Jürgen von Arnim, German general (b. 1889)
 September 3 – E. E. Cummings, American poet (b. 1894)
 September 4 
 Juan Atilio Bramuglia, Argentine composer (b. 1903)
 William Clothier, American tennis player (b. 1881)
 September 5 – Roy MacNairy, English cricketer (b. 1904)
 September 6 – Hanns Eisler, Austrian composer (b. 1898)
 September 7
 Karen Blixen, Danish writer (b. 1885)
 Morris Louis, American painter (b. 1912)
 Graham Walker, English motorcycle racer (b. 1896)
 September 10 – Constantion Bădescu, Romanian general (b. 1892)
 September 11 – Kenkichi Ueda, Japanese general (b. 1875)
 September 12 – Wiktor Thommée, Polish general (b. 1881)
 September 18 – Ahmad bin Yahya, King of Yemen (b. 1891)
 September 19 – Nikolai Pogodin, Soviet playwright (b. 1900)
 September 20 – Conrad Helfrich, Dutch admiral (b. 1886)
 September 21 – Ouyang Yuqian, Chinese playwright, director and Peking opera performer (b. 1889)
 September 23
 Louis de Soissons, Canadian-born English architect (b. 1890)
 Patrick Hamilton, English dramatist (b. 1904)
 September 26 – Francisco de Paula Brochado da Rocha, Prime Minister of Brazil (b. 1910)
 September 30 – Bernard Rawlings, British admiral (b. 1889)

October

 October 1 – Ludwig Bemelmans, Austro-Hungarian born American writer (b. 1898)
 October 2
 Henry Louis Larsen, American Marine Corps general; Governor of American Samoa and Governor of Guam (b. 1890)
 Frank Lovejoy, American actor (b. 1912)
 October 3 – K. Kanagaratnam, Ceylon Tamil civil servant and politician (b. 1892)
 October 6 – Tod Browning, American film director (b. 1880)
 October 7 – Henri Oreiller, French Olympic alpine skier (b. 1925)
 October 8 – Solomon Linda, South African singer-songwriter (b. 1909)
 October 9 – Milan Vidmar, Slovenian chess player (b. 1885)
 October 10 – Stancho Belkovski, Bulgarian architect and lecturer (b. 1891)
 October 11 – Erich von Tschermak, Austrian agronomist (b. 1871)
 October 12 – Alberto Teisaire, Argentine Navy officer and Vice President of the Republic (assassinated) (b. 1891)
 October 14 – Irma Gramatica, Italian actress (b. 1870)
 October 16
 Gaston Bachelard, French philosopher (b. 1884)
 Princess Helen of Serbia (b.1884)
 October 17 – Natalia Goncharova, Russian artist (b. 1881)
 October 20 – Jesús Herrera, Spanish international footballer (b. 1938)
 October 26 – Louise Beavers, American actress (b. 1902)
 October 27
 Otto Froitzheim, German tennis player (b. 1884)
 Enrico Mattei, Italian politician (plane crash) (b. 1906)
 October 31 – Louis Massignon, French Catholic scholar of Islam (b. 1883)

November

 November 7 – Eleanor Roosevelt, American politician, diplomat and activist, First Lady of the United States (b. 1884)
 November 8 – Willis H. O'Brien, American stop motion animator (b. 1886)
 November 14 
 Alwi bin Thahir al-Haddad, Yemeni-born Malaysian Islamic scholar (b. 1884)
 Manuel Gálvez, Argentine writer and historian (b. 1882)
 November 15 – Irene (costume designer), American costume designer (b. 191)
 November 18 
 Domingo Arrieta León, Mexican general and statesman (b. 1874)
 Niels Bohr, Danish physicist, Nobel Prize laureate (b. 1885)
 November 19 – Francisco Tudela y Varela, 68th Prime Minister of Peru (b. 1876)
 November 21 – Frank Amyot, Canadian canoeist (b. 1904)
 November 22 – René Coty, 17th President of France (b. 1882)
 November 23 – Grace Butler, New Zealand artist (b. 1886)
 November 25 – Forrest Smithson, American Olympic athlete (b. 1884)
 November 26
 Aleksandr Antonov, Soviet actor (b. 1898)
 Albert Sarraut, 2-time prime minister of France (b. 1872)
 November 28
 K. C. Dey, Indian singer, composer, actor and teacher (b. 1893)
 Queen Wilhelmina of the Netherlands (b. 1880)
 November 29 – Erik Scavenius, 12th Prime Minister of Denmark (b. 1877)
 November 30 – Joseph Lade Pawsey, Australian radio astronomer (b. 1908)

December

 December 6 – Harry Bauler, American politician (b. 1910)
 December 7 – Kirsten Flagstad, Norwegian soprano (b. 1895)
 December 13 
 Sir John Cunningham, British admiral (b. 1885)
 Ahmad Nami, Prince of the Ottoman Empire, 5th Prime Minister of Syria and 2nd President of Syria (b. 1879)
 December 15 – Charles Laughton, English actor and director (b. 1899)
 December 16 – Lew Landers, American TV and film director (b. 1901)
 December 17 – Thomas Mitchell, American actor (b. 1892)
 December 18 – Garrett Mattingly, American historian (b. 1900)
 December 19 – Jill Talley, American voice actress
 December 20 – Emil Artin, Austrian mathematician (b. 1898)
 December 21 – Gary Hocking, Rhodesian motorcycle racer (b. 1937)
 December 23 – José Giral, Spanish politician, former Prime Minister (b. 1879)
 December 24
 Wilhelm Ackermann, German mathematician (b. 1896)
 Eveline Adelheid von Maydell, German artist (b. 1890)
 December 26 – Calcedonio Di Pisa, Italian criminal (b. 1931)
 December 28 – Kazimierz Świtalski, Polish diplomat, politician, soldier and military officer, 18th Prime Minister of Poland (b. 1886)
 December 30 – Arthur Lovejoy, American philosopher and historian (b. 1873)

Date unknown
 Ștefan Balaban, Romanian general (b. 1890)
 Petre Cameniță, Romanian general (b. 1889)
 Fawzi Al-Mulki, Prime Minister of Jordan (b. 1910)
 Abdallah Beyhum, 10th Prime Minister of Lebanon (b. 1879)
 Henry Matthew Talintyre, British comic strip artist (b. 1893)

Nobel Prizes

 Physics – Lev Landau
 Chemistry – Max Perutz, John Kendrew
 Physiology or Medicine – Francis Crick, James Watson, Maurice Wilkins
 Literature – John Steinbeck
 Peace – Linus Pauling

References